Olivella anazora is a species of small sea snail, marine gastropod mollusk in the subfamily Olivellinae, in the family Olividae, the olives.  Species in the genus Olivella are commonly called dwarf olives.

Description
The length of the shell varies between 9 mm and 20 mm.

Distribution
This species occurs in the Pacific Ocean from the Gulf of California to Peru; also off the Galapagos.

References

anazora
Gastropods described in 1835